Svendborg-Nyborgbanen is a now decommissioned railway between Svendborg and Faaborg. It opened November 24, 1916, and closed May 22, 1954.

Defunct railroads
Closed railway lines in Denmark
Railway lines opened in 1916
Railway lines closed in 1954